Harian Indonesia (English: Indonesia Daily), formerly in Chinese as 印尼星洲日报 (English: Indonesia - Sin Chew Daily), is a Chinese-language newspaper published in Indonesia. The paper is the oldest continuously published Chinese-language newspaper in Indonesia.

History 
Harian Indonesia was first published on September 12, 1966, managed by the Yayasan Indonesia Press (YIP, Indonesia Press Foundation).  In 1967 (the beginning of New Order), there were ban on all of Chinese publications in Indonesia as one of steps to resolving "Chinese Problems". During New Order, Harian Indonesia was the only Chinese-language newspaper that allowed to publish under the supervision of Indonesia's Ministry of Information.

In 2000, the paper took over by a new company PT. Emas Indonesia Duaribu. At the end of 2004, the company was acquired by PT. Abdi Bangsa Tbk. (Mahaka Media), thus Harian Indonesia is then under the auspices of Mahaka Media, along with a number of other media such as Jak TV and Republika newspaper. Since December 1, 2006, Harian Indonesia has collaborating with a Malaysian Chinese-language newspaper, Sin Chew Daily. On January 17, 2007, Harian Indonesia was relaunched as Indonesia - Sin Chew Daily with editorial management from Sin Chew Daily.

On January 1, 2021, due to business restructure, Harian Indonesia - Sin Chew Daily had become to original name "Harian Indonesia".

See also 
 Sin Chew Daily
 Chinese Indonesians#Media
 List of newspapers in Indonesia

References

External links
Official website
Former Website with Sin Chew Daily 

Publications established in 1966
Chinese-language newspapers
Newspapers published in Jakarta
Mahaka Media